Auguste Peltz (1824–1900) was a German businessperson.  She founded and managed the famous Schneeberg Doll Factory in 1849–1876.

References

1824 births
1900 deaths
19th-century German women
19th-century German businesspeople
Dollmakers
German industrialists